John Charles Peart (13 October 1884 – September 1965) was an English professional footballer who played in the Football League for Arsenal as a full back.

Personal life 
Peart enlisted as a driver in the Royal Army Service Corps in 1903 and later held the rank of corporal. He served with the BEF at the Battle of Mons in 1914, after which he was discharged from the army and then recalled in November 1916.

Honours 
Brentford
 London Combination: 1918–19

Career statistics

References

1884 births
English footballers
English Football League players
Brentford F.C. wartime guest players
1965 deaths
People from Tewkesbury
Arsenal F.C. players
Croydon Common F.C. players
Margate F.C. players
Southern Football League players
Royal Army Service Corps soldiers
British Army personnel of World War I
Sportspeople from Gloucestershire
Association football defenders